Frank Forrester Church IV (September 23, 1948 – September 24, 2009) was a leading Unitarian Universalist minister, author, and theologian. He was Senior Minister of the Unitarian Church of All Souls in New York City, until late 2006 when he was appointed as Minister of Public Theology.
He wrote about Christianity, Gnosticism, religious liberty in the US tradition, and his own father, a US Senator.

Biography
Church was born in Palo Alto, California, while his father, Frank Church, was a student at Stanford Law School. Following graduation in 1950, the family returned to Boise, Idaho. His father was elected to the United States Senate in 1956 and served four terms, until January 1981.

Church was a graduate of Stanford University and Harvard Divinity School. He received a Ph.D. in early church history from Harvard University in 1978.

In 1991, Church's affair with a congregant brought his ability to serve as minister into question, but most of his congregation supported him.

On February 4, 2008, Church sent a letter to the members of his congregation informing them that he had terminal cancer.  He told them of his intention, which he successfully realized, to sum up his thoughts on the topics that had been pervasive in his work in a final book, entitled Love & Death.

Church died of esophageal cancer in New York City on September 24, 2009, a day after his 61st birthday. He is buried in Morris Hill Cemetery in Boise.

Writings
Church is best known as a leader of liberal religion. Between 1985 and his death, he wrote or edited more than 20 books. These include technical studies of Christian and Gnostic literature, as well as over a dozen books addressing a wider audience.

Books authored by Church include:
 Father and Son: A Personal Biography of Senator Frank Church of Idaho
 The trilogy A Humane Comedy: The Devil and Dr. Church, Entertaining Angels, and The Seven Deadly Virtues
 Early Christian Prayer
 Early Christian Hymns
 The Essential Tillich
 God and Other Famous Liberals: Recapturing Bible, Flag, and Family from the Far Right, Walker & Company, 1996
 A Chosen Faith: An Introduction to Unitarian Universalism, with John A. Buehrens, Beacon Press, 1998
 The American Creed: A Spiritual and Patriotic Primer, 2002
 So Help Me God: The Founding Fathers and the First Great Battle Over Church and State, 2007
 Freedom From Fear: Finding the Courage to Act, Love and Be
 Love & Death, Beacon Press, 2008
 The Cathedral of the World: A Universalist Theology, Beacon Press, 2009
Books edited by Church:
  Restoring Faith: America's Religious Leaders Answer Terror with Hope, Walker & Company, 2001
  The Separation of Church and State:  Writings on a Fundamental Freedom by America's Founders, Beacon Press, 2004

Television appearance
Church can be seen offering commentary in the History Channel documentary Christmas Unwrapped: The History of Christmas.

References

External links
 "For the Victims of the Day of Terror", sermon by Forrest Church.  All Souls Unitarian Church, New York City, September 12, 2001.
 
 Love and Death Facing cancer with lessons learned from my parishioners, By Forrest Church in UU World magazine
 New York Times obituary
 Obituary at Unitarian Universalist Association site
 Video: 
People magazine - May 19, 1986

1948 births
2009 deaths
20th-century American writers
20th-century Unitarian clergy
21st-century American writers
21st-century Unitarian clergy
American religious leaders
American Unitarian Universalists
Deaths from cancer in New York (state)
Deaths from esophageal cancer
Harvard Divinity School alumni
Stanford University alumni
Unitarian Universalist clergy
Writers from Boise, Idaho
Writers from New York City
20th-century American male writers